Robert McGregor & Sons, also known just as Mc Gregor was a large civil engineering company based in Boothstown, in what is now Greater Manchester, England.

History
It was founded in Manchester in 1927.

It specialised in building concrete surfaces for roads using a machine known as a concrete paver. It worked with the company Cementation Construction Ltd. It developed the CPP60 concrete paver.

It became part of Norwest Holst Civil Engineering, when bought in October 1978 for £3m.

Structure
It was based on the A572 in Walkden in Greater Manchester (Salford). It also had a site in at Birdholme in Chesterfield, Derbyshire.

Products
Roads it built include:
 A1(M) Birtley bypass (£2.5 million)
 A1 Grantham bypass, 1962
 A1 Newark-on-Trent bypass, 1964
 A1 Improvement from North of Muskham to South of Carlton including Cromwell By-pass, 1965 (£772,000)
 A1 Sutton-on-Trent, Weston, and Tuxford By-Pass, 1967, £4m
 A46 dualling between Six Hills (B676) and Widmerpool (A606), December 1965, £1.126 million
 A1 Eaton Socon bypass, 1971
 M56 North Cheshire Motorway

Constructions:
 Coedty Reservoir dam

Sport
It founded the McGregor Trophy in Golf in 1982, initially held at Radcliffe-on-Trent Golf Club.

References

External links
 1965 British Pathé film showing construction of the Cromwell by-pass in Nottinghamshire

Concrete pioneers
Construction and civil engineering companies of England
Companies based in Salford
Chesterfield, Derbyshire
Defunct companies of England
Construction and civil engineering companies established in 1927
British companies disestablished in 1978
1927 establishments in England
1978 disestablishments in England
British companies established in 1927